was a Japanese samurai of the Sengoku period and Edo period.

History
In 1590, Tokugawa Ieyasu established Ina Tadatsugu in Musashi Province in at Komoro Domain with 13,000 koku revenues. After the Battle of Sekigahara in 1600, the han was increased to 20,000 koku.  However, the clan was dispossessed in 1613 because of his son Tadamasa's part in a plot organized by Okubo Nagayasu.

See also
 Ina clan

References

External links
 "Komoro" at Edo 300  

Hatamoto
Samurai
Daimyo
1550 births
1610 deaths